The 1927–28 Luxembourg National Division was the 18th season of top level association football in Luxembourg.

Overview
The competition contested by 8 teams, and CA Spora Luxembourg won the championship.

League standings

Results

References

Luxembourg - List of final tables (RSSSF)

Luxembourg National Division seasons
Lux
Nat